Punta Catalina Airport  is a public use airport located near Punta Catalina (es), Magallanes y Antártica Chilena, Chile.

See also
List of airports in Chile

References

External links 
 Airport record for Punta Catalina Airport at Landings.com

Airports in Chile
Airports in Tierra del Fuego Province, Chile